During the 1991–92 English football season, Tottenham Hotspur F.C. competed in the Football League First Division.

Season summary
In the 1991–92 season, Terry Venables became chief executive, with Peter Shreeves again taking charge of first-team duties. Tottenham were competing in Europe that season, in the UEFA Cup Winners' Cup, reaching the quarter-final where they were edged out by Dutch side Feyenoord. Gary Lineker, who in November confirmed that he would be leaving Tottenham at the end of the season to play in Japan, scored 28 goals and was voted Football Writers' Footballer of the Year, but these goals were not enough to prevent Tottenham from under-performing throughout the campaign, losing 20 games as they finished 15th.

Final league table

Results
Tottenham Hotspur's score comes first

Legend

Football League First Division

FA Charity Shield

FA Cup

League Cup

European Cup Winners' Cup

Preliminary Round

First Round

Second Round

Quarter-finals

Squad

Transfers

In

Out

Transfers in:  £2,900,000
Transfers out:  £6,525,000
Total spending:  £3,625,000

Statistics

Appearances and goals
{| class="wikitable" style="text-align:center"
|-
! rowspan="2" style="vertical-align:bottom;" | Pos.
! rowspan="2" style="vertical-align:bottom; width:240px" | Name
! colspan="2" style="width:85px;" | Division One
! colspan="2" style="width:85px;" | FA Cup
! colspan="2" style="width:85px;" | EFL Cup
! colspan="2" style="width:85px;" | Charity Shield
! colspan="2" style="width:85px;" | Cup Winners Cup
! colspan="2" style="width:85px;" | Total
|-
! Apps
! Goals
! Apps
! Goals
! Apps
! Goals
! Apps
! Goals
! Apps
! Goals
! Apps
! Goals
|-
| MF
| align="left" |  Paul Allen
|| 38+1 || 3 || 2 || 0 || 7 || 2 || 1 || 0 || 6+1 || 0 || 54+2 || 5
|-
| DF
| align="left" |  Guðni Bergsson
|| 17+11 || 1 || 0+1 || 0 || 3+2 || 0 || 0 || 0 || 5+1 || 0 || 25+15 || 1
|-
| DF
| align="left" |  Jason Cundy
|| 10 || 0 || 0 || 0 || 0 || 0 || 0 || 0 || 0 || 0 || 10 || 0
|-
| FW
| align="left" |  Gordon Durie
|| 31 || 7 || 1 || 0 || 6 || 2 || 0 || 0 || 8 || 3 || 46 || 12
|-
| DF
| align="left" |  Justin Edinburgh
|| 22+1 || 0 || 0 || 0 || 1+2 || 0 || 0 || 0 || 3 || 0 || 26+3 || 0
|-
| DF
| align="left" |  Terry Fenwick
|| 22+1 || 0 || 2 || 0 || 4 || 0 || 1 || 0 || 4 || 0 || 33+1 || 0
|-
| MF
| align="left" |  Andy Gray
|| 14 || 1 || 0 || 0 || 0 || 0 || 0 || 0 || 0 || 0 || 14 || 1
|-
| DF
| align="left" |  Ian Hendon
|| 0+2 || 0 || 0 || 0 || 1 || 0 || 0 || 0 || 0+2 || 0 || 1+4 || 0
|-
| FW
| align="left" |  John Hendry
|| 1+4 || 1 || 0 || 0 || 0+1 || 0 || 0 || 0 || 0 || 0 || 1+5 || 1
|-
| MF
| align="left" |  Scott Houghton
|| 0+10 || 2 || 0 || 0 || 0+2 || 0 || 0 || 0 || 0+2 || 0 || 0+14 || 2
|-
| MF
| align="left" |  David Howells
|| 27+4 || 1 || 1 || 0 || 5 || 1 || 1 || 0 || 6 || 0 || 40+4 || 2
|-
| FW
| align="left" |  Gary Lineker
|| 35 || 28 || 2 || 0 || 5 || 5 || 1 || 0 || 8 || 2 || 51 || 35
|-
| DF
| align="left" |  Gary Mabbutt
|| 40 || 2 || 2 || 0 || 6 || 0 || 1 || 0 || 8 || 1 || 57 || 3
|-
| MF
| align="left" |  Jeff Minton
|| 2 || 1 || 0 || 0 || 0 || 0 || 0 || 0 || 0 || 0 || 2 || 1
|-
| MF
| align="left" |  John Moncur
|| 0 || 0 || 0 || 0 || 0+1 || 0 || 0 || 0 || 0 || 0 || 0+1 || 0
|-
| FW
| align="left" |  Paul Moran
|| 0 || 0 || 0 || 0 || 0 || 0 || 0 || 0 || 0+1 || 0 || 0+1 || 0
|-
| MF
| align="left" |  Nayim
|| 22+9 || 1 || 0+1 || 0 || 4+2 || 0 || 1 || 0 || 6 || 0 || 33+12 || 1
|-
| MF
| align="left" |  Vinny Samways
|| 26+1 || 1 || 2 || 0 || 6+1 || 1 || 1 || 0 || 6+1 || 0 || 41+3 || 2
|-
| MF
| align="left" |  Steve Sedgley
|| 21+13 || 0 || 2 || 0 || 6+1 || 0 || 1 || 0 || 4+3 || 0 || 34+17 || 0
|-
| MF
| align="left" |  Paul Stewart
|| 38 || 5 || 2 || 0 || 7 || 1 || 1 || 0 || 8 || 0 || 56 || 6
|-
| GK
| align="left" |  Erik Thorstvedt
|| 24 || 0 || 2 || 0 || 6 || 0 || 1 || 0 || 6 || 0 || 39 || 0
|-
| DF
| align="left" |  Dave Tuttle
|| 2 || 0 || 0 || 0 || 1 || 0 || 0 || 0 || 1 || 1 || 4 || 1
|-
| DF
| align="left" |  Pat Van Den Hauwe
|| 35 || 0 || 2 || 0 || 6 || 0 || 1 || 0 || 6 || 0 || 50 || 0
|-
| GK
| align="left" |  Ian Walker
|| 18 || 0 || 0 || 0 || 1 || 0 || 0 || 0 || 2 || 0 || 21 || 0
|-
| FW
| align="left" |  Paul Walsh
|| 17+12 || 3 || 2 || 0 || 2+1 || 1 || 0 || 0 || 1+3 || 0 || 22+16 || 4
|-

Goal scorers

Clean sheets

References

Tottenham Hotspur F.C. seasons
Tottenham Hotspur